Better Than That is a UK anti-hate crime campaign created in response to the significant rise in hate crimes following the 2016 United Kingdom European Union membership referendum.

It launched on 1 December 2016. The campaign is supported by UK Prime Minister Theresa May and a cross-party group of politicians.

Launch
The launch meeting on 1 December 2016 was attended by a number of parliamentarians including members of the Conservative Party (Baroness Warsi, Eric Pickles), the Labour Party (Rosena Allin-Khan) and the Liberal Democrats (Tom Brake).

Supporting organisations
Among the organizations which support the campaign are:
British Future
Community Security Trust
Faith Matters
Jewish Labour Movement
Jewish Leadership Council
Kick It Out
Polish Social and Cultural Association
Tell MAMA UK
Board of Deputies of British Jews
Union of Jewish Students

References

External links
 

Hate crime